It Should've Been Me may refer to:

 It Should've Been Me (album), an album by Zoot Money's Big Roll Band
 "It Should've Been Me" (Memphis Curtis song), sung by Ray Charles 1954
 "It Should Have Been Me" (Norman Whitfield song) for Kim Weston 1963, Gladys Knight 1968
 "Should've Been Me", 1987 song by Tiffany from Tiffany
 "Should've Been Me" (Naughty Boy song)
 "Should've Been Me", debut single by Citizen Way